The Casagrandes is an American animated comedy television series developed by Michael Rubiner and Miguel Puga that aired on Nickelodeon from October 14, 2019 to September 30, 2022. The series features the voices of Izabella Alvarez, Carlos PenaVega, Sumalee Montano, Sonia Manzano, Ruben Garfias, Carlos Alazraqui, Roxana Ortega, Alexa PenaVega, Jared Kozak, Alex Cazares, Cristina Milizia, Dee Bradley Baker, and Eugenio Derbez.

Series overview

Episodes

Season 1 (2019–20)

Season 2 (2020–21)

Season 3 (2021–22)

Shorts

References

Lists of American children's animated television series episodes
Lists of American comedy television series episodes
Lists of Nickelodeon television series episodes
Casagrandes episodes